Melanostomias paucilaternatus, the spothead dragonfish, is a species of fish from the Melanostomias genus. It has 16 to 18 anal soft rays and 13 to 16 dorsal soft rays.

References 

Fish described in 1978